Modasa is a town and a municipality in Aravalli district in the Indian state of Gujarat. Modasa was named after the Bhil chieftain Malaji Bhil, who ruled in Modasa during 1466.

Modasa became headquarters of new Aravalli district, carved out from  Sabarkantha. The new district was declared on 26 January 2013 and formed on 15 August 2013.

It is an economic centre for agricultural exports, at both the provincial and national levels.  As a centre for the surrounding villages, Modasa acts as a transportation hub for both residents and tourists, and has two large hospitals. The city also provides a nucleus of doctors for the people of northern Gujarat and some migrants of southern Rajasthan.

Modasa is emerging as an education centre for the area, with new pharmacy and engineering colleges and CBSE school supplementing the more traditional educational faculties. The city now has colleges of law, science, education, arts, commerce, and pharmacy, as well as business administration to MBA, BBA and BCA levels. Study courses run by the Government Engineering college include mechanical, computer, electronics and communication, civil engineering, electrical, and automotive engineering.

History

The history of Modasa dates back thousands of years. It is believed that region around Modasa has been populated since the days of Indus valley civilization. Many architectural items, coins, religious artifacts, brick etc. are found at excavation sites around Modasa. These findings are evidence of the prominent role Modasa played during various periods of Indian history. Modasa has been place of significance in the times of Mauryas, Shatvahns, Kshtraps Guptas, Maritrakas, Rastrakutas etc. It is believed that Modasa is refereed as Maulayashah tirth in Skand puran. Also a more-than-2000-year-old stone has been found that refers to place as Mandasan. It is also claimed that in past Modasa was called Modhak vas or Mohadakvas. Though it is not clear where this name came from.

Modasa has been referred to in many religious stories from past. Temples of many diverse faith and religion are found throughout the
town. Among Hindus, Jains and Shiva worshipers dominated town for many years. Pusti marg was introduced only about 300 years ago.

In medieval times Modasa used to be the rest point for travellers going to Surat port for Mecca from northern Indian places like Delhi, etc.

The architectural sites around Modasa indicate that once there was a kote (wall) around the town. Also there are indications that the kote has been destroyed many times.  Though details are limited it is believed that town was sacked in past by armies from Muslims
subas of Gujarat as well as Marathas.

It was an important frontier fortified post during Gujarat Sultanate (1415) under Sultan Ahmed Shah I. At the close of the sixteenth century it was the chief place in a tract of 162 villages, yielding a yearly revenue of £80,000 (Rs. 8,00,000). Under the Mughals, Shahab-ud-din, the 3rd Viceroy (1577-1583), repaired the fort at Modasa, and stationing a party of cavalry there completely settled the country. During the eighteenth century Modasa greatly declined, and when (1818) it came under British management, the town was most backward. Quickly recovering, it had in 1825 a numerous and respectable body of traders with an estimated capital of £90,000 (Rs. 9,00,000).

During British rule though most of the area around Modasa was under state of Idar, Modasa was under direct control of British government in India. This might have brought some stability in the late 19th century. During the days of independent struggle, led by Mahatma Gandhi, Modasa participated very actively. Starting from 1930's Modasa was a vibrant place for the non-violent styagrah movement.

There was a British passenger ship named after Modasa. The "S.S Modasa" was one of a class of six near-sister ships owned by British-India Steam Navigation Co. Built by Swan Hunter & Wigham Richardson.

Modasa RTO code is GJ-31 instead of GJ-33

Geography

It has an average elevation of 197 metres (646 feet). Most of the water for Modasa comes from the Mazum river, on which, about 5 kilometers from Modasa, the Mazum reservoir is situated.

Educational institutions

After independence the leader of Modasa decided to take the opportunity to provide higher education to the needy of this area and establish a public charitable trust which is registered the Act.  The purpose of this trust is to establish and run an institution for higher education catering to the needs of this area and bring them into the mainstream. The trust is aptly named after a well known revolutionary, freedom fighter, social worker and educationist "Shri Mathuradas Laljidas Gandhi". The M. L. Gandhi Higher Education Society started Arts and Science College first with the donation of generous donors like Sir Purushottamdas Thakordas and Shir Somalal kasturdas Shah and the partners of Shir krishan Oil Mill. So, the college was named after them. Thus the first college was called Shir S.K.Shah & Shri Krishan O.M.Arts College and Sir P.T.Science College in 1960. In a short time this college started throbbing with
vitality under the academic leadership of its first principal Dr. Dhirubhai Thakar, who, after his retirement is busy making an encyclopedia in Gujarat named Gujarati Vishwakosh, a most prestigious work. The first president of this education society was the late shri Raichanddas Katudas Shah.

Institutes By Modasa College Campus

Sir P T Science College
Shri S K Shah And O.m arts college
Shri H S Shah College Of Commerce
B D Shah College Of Education
Shri N S Patel law College
Shri B M Shah College Of Pharmacy
Shrimati M L G Bhalavat Pharmacy P G Centre
P T C college
Shrimati K A Modi M S W College
Shri B H Gandhi BBA College
Matrushri L J Gandhi BCA College
Dr. N J Shah PGDCA College
Shri K H Patel M.ed Institute
Shri J B Shah English Medium School{Primary To Higher Secondary}
Shri M J Mehta IGNOU Study Centre
BAOU Study Centre
A R Sura Museum
PCSS Career Development Academy
GEC Modasa

Other institutes include Makhdum Education society, Chanakya Vishwavidyala, New leap, Karimi Education society, etc. which run different schools from primary education to higher education

Modasa also Has two engineering Colleges namely (1) Government Engineering College, Modasa (popularly known as GEC MODASA). (2) Tatva Engineering College.

GEC modasa was inaugurated on 23 August 1984 By then Chief Minister of Gujarat Shri Madhav Singh Solanki near the bank of Mazum river. The institute is known for its best Mechanical & Civil Engineering facilities and Faculties. The GEC Modasa has given many excellent Engineers to the nation who are in the national and state level institutions such as IIT, Kharagpur, Gujarat Technological University and other Government of India established technological and scientific institutions and organisations.

GEC, MODASA offers undergraduate and postgraduate courses in the field of engineering as the name suggests. Offered Engineering fields are mainly Mechanical, Civil, IT and Computer science Engineering, Electrical engineering and electronics and communication engineering.

The GEC, Modasa is the leading institute in the north Gujarat province. It is also the GTU affiliated institute since 2007. The institute was affiliated to Hemchandracharya North Gujarat University, Patan during the period of 1984 to 2007.

Demographics

 India census, Modasa had a population of 90,000. Males constitute 51% of the male population and females 49%.  Modasa has an average literacy rate of 74%, higher than the national average of 59.5%: male literacy is 81%, with female literacy at 67%. In Modasa, 13% of the population is under 6 years of age.
The Modasa Municipality has population of 67,648 of which 34,917 are males while 32,731 are females as per report released by Census India 2011.

Notable residents
Jivaraj Papriwal, a wealthy merchant of Modasa who had thousands of Jain images carved and transported to towns across India. All of them bear an inscription mentioning that they were installed at Modasa in Samvat 1548.
 Jigar Shah (Born in Modasa), founder of "Sun Edison", who creates billions of green economy of solar power generation. He shows the world that sustainable solar  energy is a future of power generation.
 Ramanlal Soni: A Gujarati writer was also born in Modasa. He is Famous for his Novels and stories for Children.
 Anees Bazmee : popular Hindi film director
 S M Osama : Pharmacist who worked on many medicinal researches notably Gout and Transdermal Patch
 Bhogilal Gandhi : Gujarati Poet who wrote more than 80 books

In popular culture
 Modasa appears in Gujarati short story "Porter na panjama" by Pannalal Patel.
 Influenza Outbreak of Modasa was shown in Aamir Khan's TV series Satyamev Jayate in season 2 Episode 3.

References

External links

Cities and towns in Aravalli district